Furoin or 1,2-di(furan-2-yl)-2-hydroxyethanone is an organic compound with formula C10H8O4. It can be produced from furfural by a benzoin condensation reaction catalyzed by cyanide ions.

Reactions
Furoin synthesis from furfural is also catalyzed by vitamin B1 (thiamine). In 1957, Ronald Breslow proposed that this reaction involves a relatively stable carbene form of thiamine. In the catalytic cycle shown below two molecules of furfural react to give furoin, via a thiazol-2-ylidene catalyst, resulting from loss of one proton at carbon 2 of the thiazolium cation of vitamin B1:

This was the first evidence for the existence of persistent carbenes.

Uses
Furoin has been used as a plasticizer.

References

Acyloins
Plasticizers
2-Furyl compounds